Dean Weber (born August 12, 1962) is an American entrepreneur, computer scientist and inventor, described by many as "the father of the intelligent personal assistant" and was credited for the commercial launch of the first virtual assistant called IVAN, in 1999.  During that time, Weber was founder of One Voice Technologies, an Artificial Intelligence company founded in 1998 in San Diego, CA.  At One Voice, Weber was instrumental in launching voice solutions worldwide to millions of users and ultimately sold his patent portfolio to Apple in 2010 prior to Apple's launch of Siri. 

In 2017 and 2018, Weber showcased advanced Conversational AI solutions for connected cars with Mitsubishi and Faurecia at auto shows in Detroit, Paris, Shanghai, and Consumer Electronics Show (CES) in Las Vegas.

Today, Weber leads a team of entrepreneurs and AI scientists creating conversational voice solutions in the Digital health sector.

References 

1962 births
Living people
21st-century American businesspeople
American computer scientists
20th-century American businesspeople
American computer businesspeople
21st-century American inventors